× Renanthopsis, abbreviated Rnthps. in the horticultural trade, is the nothogenus for intergeneric hybrids between the orchid genera Phalaenopsis and Renanthera (Phal. × Ren.).

References

Orchid nothogenera
Aeridinae